R. G. Allen served as a member of the 1863 California State Assembly, representing California's 1st State Senate district.

References

Members of the California State Assembly
19th-century American politicians